Military fiat is a process whereby a decision is made and enforced by military means without the participation of other political elements. The Latin term fiat, translated as "let it be," suggests the autocratic attitude ascribed to such a process. For example, many coups involve the imposition of a new government by military fiat.

See also 
 Ecoregional Democracy
 fiat money

References

External links 
 Goldsmith and his Gaian hierarchy

Political terminology
Civil–military relations